M-150 is a non-carbonated energy drink marketed by Osotspa Company Limited. In Thailand, it is sold in 150 mL glass bottles. In 2010, it was reported that M-150 had a 65 percent share of market but dropped to 46 percent by 2014.

See also
 Lipovitan-D
 Shark Energy
 Carabao
 Krating Daeng

References 

Products introduced in 1985
1985 establishments in Thailand
Energy drinks
Thai drink brands